The Tanzania Railways Corporation (TRC) is a state-owned enterprise that runs one of Tanzania's two main railway networks.

When the East African Railways and Harbours Corporation was dissolved in 1977 and its assets divided between Kenya, Tanzania and Uganda, TRC was formed to take over its operations in Tanzania. In 1997 the inland shipping division became a separate company.

MGR 
In November 2021, TRC received the three modern locomotives (H10 series) worth Sh22 billion to strengthen their Metre-gauge railway (MGR) line, ordered from Malaysia.

Rail network

Two east–west lines linking the coast and the hinterland were built under colonial rule as German East Africa: the Central Line runs from Dar es Salaam to Kigoma, and the Tanga Line from Tanga to Arusha. A north-south connection, from Korogwe to Ruvu, links the two lines. The main line runs to Lake Victoria where a connection operates via Lake Victoria train ferries with the Uganda Railway. From the Tanga line a line to Kenya is disused.

There is a break-of-gauge at Dar es Salaam to the Tanzania-Zambia Railway Authority (TAZARA)  line to Zambia. A second link is at Kidatu, where the TAZARA line meets the Kidatu branch.

Former Marine Division
TRC inherited ferry and cargo ship services on Lake Tanganyika and Lake Nyasa and some ships on Lake Victoria.

TRC introduced  on Lake Victoria in about 1979,  on Lake Tanganyika in 1982 and passenger and cargo ship  on Lake Victoria in 1988.

She had many more passengers aboard than she was certified to carry and at least 800 people were killed. After the disaster criminal charges were brought against nine TRC officials including Bukoba'''s master and the manager of the Marine Division.

In 1997 the Marine Division became a separate company, Marine Services Company Limited.

Rail accidents
On 24 June 2002 the Igandu train disaster killed 281 people, the second highest number of deaths in a train disaster in Africa (the highest being the Awash rail disaster).

Privatisation, re-nationalization and recent plans
In 2007 RITES Ltd of India won a contract from the Parastatal Sector Reform Commission (PSRC) to operate passenger and freight trains on a concession basis for 25 years. The concession agreement was signed on 3 September 2007, to begin on 1 October 2007.  The railway will be run as Tanzania Railway Ltd, with the government owning a 49% stake.

There were moves to abandon the contract "due in part, to the fact that the Indian investor failed to pay over USD 6 million in concession fees to the Tanzania government in 2008" but RITES officials countered noting that the contract "misled Rites officials by indicating that the Railway Assets Holding Company (Rahco) was in possession of 92 working locomotives when, in actuality, only 55 existed"''. In 2010, the government terminated the contract and resumed control.

In 2007 the Deputy Minister for Infrastructure Maua Abeid Daftari proposed conversion to standard gauge.

Sleepers 

In 2008 tenders were sought for -gauge steel sleepers convertible to  gauge and for concrete sleeper plant for dual  and  gauges.

See also
 Tanzania Standard Gauge Railway
 East African Railway Master Plan
 Central Line (Tanzania)
 Rail transport in Tanzania
 TAZARA
 Transport in Tanzania

References

https://yapimerkezi.com.tr/En/Projects/Ongoing-Projects/Dar-Es-Salaam-Morogoro-RAILWAY

External links
 

Railway companies of Tanzania
Railway companies established in 1977
Government-owned companies of Tanzania
1977 establishments in Tanzania
Metre gauge railways in Tanzania
Government-owned railway companies